Balsa labecula, the white-blotched balsa, is a species of moth in the family Noctuidae (the owlet moths). It is found in North America.

The MONA or Hodges number for Balsa labecula is 9664.

References

Further reading

External links

 

Noctuidae
Articles created by Qbugbot
Moths described in 1880